Benjamin Jensen (born 13 April 1975 in Mandal, Vest-Agder) is a Norwegian decathlete. He represented Mandal og Halse IL, IK Tjalve and IL Norna-Salhus during his active career. His personal best in decathlon is 8160 points, achieved in August 1999 in Roskilde. This is the former Norwegian record.

Achievements

References

1975 births
Living people
Norwegian decathletes
World Athletics Championships athletes for Norway
Universiade medalists in athletics (track and field)
Universiade bronze medalists for Norway
Medalists at the 1999 Summer Universiade